Simon Pohoryles is a male former Polish international table tennis player.

He won a bronze medal at the 1935 World Table Tennis Championships in the Swaythling Cup (men's team event) with Alojzy Ehrlich and Władysław Loewenhertz for Poland.

Along with his teammates they were the first Polish medal winners at the Championships.

See also
 List of table tennis players
 List of World Table Tennis Championships medalists

References

Polish male table tennis players
World Table Tennis Championships medalists